Colligan is a surname. Notable people with the surname include:

 Bud Colligan (born 1954), businessman and government advisor
 Ed Colligan (born 1961), businessman
 George Colligan (born 1969), jazz pianist
 Matthew Colligan, activist

See also
 Brian McColligan (born 1980), Scottish footballer
 Colligan River, river in Ireland